2 Chronicles 14 is the fourteenth chapter of the Second Book of Chronicles the Old Testament in the Christian Bible or of the second part of the Books of Chronicles in the Hebrew Bible. The book is compiled from older sources by an unknown person or group, designated by modern scholars as "the Chronicler", and had the final shape established in late fifth or fourth century BCE. This chapter belongs to the section focusing on the kingdom of Judah until its destruction by the Babylonians under Nebuchadnezzar and the beginning of restoration under Cyrus the Great of Persia  (2 Chronicles 10 to 36). The focus of this chapter is the reign of Asa, king of Judah.

Text
This chapter was originally written in the Hebrew language and is divided into 15 verses in Christian Bibles, but 14 verses in the Hebrew Bible with the following verse numbering comparison:

This article generally follows the common numbering in Christian English Bible versions, with notes to the numbering in Hebrew Bible versions.

Textual witnesses
Some early manuscripts containing the text of this chapter in Hebrew are of the Masoretic Text tradition, which includes the Aleppo Codex (10th century), and Codex Leningradensis (1008).

There is also a translation into Koine Greek known as the Septuagint, made in the last few centuries BCE. Extant ancient manuscripts of the Septuagint version include Codex Vaticanus (B; B; 4th century), and Codex Alexandrinus (A; A; 5th century).

Old Testament references
:

Asa king of Judah (14:1–2)
The record of Asa's reign in the Chronicles (2 Chronicles 14–16) is almost three times longer than in 1 Kings (15:9–24), consisting of two distinct phases: 
 34 years of fidelity
 7 years of infidelity (16:1–12).  
Although not free from fault (2 Chronicles 16:7, 10, 12), the evaluation of Asa is positive (verse 2), because overall "he did that which was good and right" (cf. 1 Kings 15:14).

Verse 1
And Abijah slept with his fathers, and they buried him in the City of David. Asa his son then reigned in his place. In his days the land was quiet for ten years.
 Parallel: 
 "City of David" refers to the "fortress of Zion" in Jerusalem, not to Bethlehem (cf. 2 Samuel 5:7).

Asa’s religious accomplishments (14:3–8)
This section deals with three themes:
 (1) Asa's cultic reforms (verses 3–5);
 (2) Asa's building projects verses 6–7); 
 (3) Asa's reinforcement of the army (verse 8). 
The Chronicles omits the abolition of the hierodules ("male prostitutes") and all edifices recorded in 1 Kings 15:12.

War between Asa and Zerah the Ethiopian (14:9–15)
This section records a sacral war (cf. 2 Chronicles 13:2–20), where the outnumbered army of Judah faced a strong enemy, but when they cried to God (in accordance to 2 Chronicles 6:34–35), they achieved a victory and took abundant booty (verses 12–15). The phrase "cities around Gerar" (verse 14) and the words "tents ... sheep... goats ...camels" indicate that the defeated enemy was an "Arab-Edomite tribe".

Verse 9
Then Zerah the Ethiopian came out against them with an army of a million men and three hundred chariots, and he came to Mareshah.
"Ethiopian": from Hebrew: ha-Kûshî, "Cushite" (cf. 1 Chronicles 1:8 for "Cush").
"Zerah the Ethiopian": has been identified with Osorchon II (hieroglyphic: Uasarken), who succeeded "Shishak" (who plundered Jerusalem at the time of Rehoboam; cf. 2 ) as the king of Egypt. His army probably consisted of Edomite-Arab Nomads, because Zerah was also an Edomite name in the Hebrew Bible, whereas "Cush" is connected with "Midian" in Habakkuk 3:7, not exclusively referring to Egypt/Ethiopia. 

See also

Related Bible parts: 1 Kings 15, 1 Chronicles 6, 1 Chronicles 18, 1 Chronicles 22, 1 Chronicles 29, 2 Chronicles 6, Habakkuk 3

Notes

References

Sources

External links
 Jewish translations:
 Divrei Hayamim II - II Chronicles - Chapter 14 (Judaica Press) in Hebrew and English translation [with Rashi's commentary] at Chabad.org
 Christian translations:
 Online Bible at GospelHall.org (ESV, KJV, Darby, American Standard Version, Bible in Basic English)
 2 Chronicles Chapter 14. Bible Gateway

14